Life, Death, Live and Freedom is a 2009 live album by John Mellencamp featuring eight songs from his 2008 album Life, Death, Love and Freedom. It was released on June 23, 2009.

Overview
The album features live versions of eight songs that eventually wound up on Mellencamp's album Life, Death, Love and Freedom. Many of these live versions were recorded prior to the release of the studio album.
As opposed to the subdued arrangements on the album that was eventually released, many of the tracks feature a full rock 'n' roll band; they are also played in higher keys, allowing Mellencamp to sing in a more familiar shouting style. Some tracks are performed solo acoustic by Mellencamp with no other musicians present. Many of the tracks on "Life, Death, Live, and Freedom" provide an interesting contrast with the versions that were released on its studio counterpart.

Track listing
"If I Die Sudden" (recorded: Greek Theatre/Los Angeles, July 31, 2008)
"Troubled Land" (recorded: Greek Theatre/Los Angeles, July 31, 2008)
"Don't Need This Body" (recorded: Mann Music Center/Philadelphia, July 8, 2008)
"Longest Days" (recorded: Greek Theatre/Los Angeles, July 31, 2008)
"Young Without Lovers" (recorded: Air Canada Centre/Toronto, February 6, 2008)
"A Ride Back Home" (recorded: Air Canada Centre/Toronto, February 6, 2008)
"Jena" (recorded: Centrum/Red Deer, AB, February 14, 2008)
"My Sweet Love" (recorded: Greek Theatre/Los Angeles, July 31, 2008)

Personnel
John Mellencamp – vocals, acoustic guitar
Andy York – guitar
Dane Clark – drums
John Gunnell – bass
Miriam Sturm – violin
Troy Kinnett – accordion, keyboard
Mike Wanchic – guitar

References

External links
Official John Mellencamp website

John Mellencamp live albums
2009 live albums
Hear Music live albums
Albums recorded at the Greek Theatre (Los Angeles)